The Rough Guide to Blues Revival is a blues compilation album originally released in 2009. Part of the World Music Network Rough Guides series, the album contains two discs: an overview of the contemporary scene on Disc One, primarily featuring American artists, and a "bonus" Disc Two highlighting Malian Samba Touré (a reference to the commonalities between the American Blues and West African music). The compilation was produced by Phil Stanton, co-founder of the World Music Network. Curation was performed by Nigel Williamson, a music journalist and author of the book The Rough Guide to the Blues. The term "blues revival" refers to the resurgence of the genre after the success of Stevie Ray Vaughan.

Critical reception
Jim Allen of AllMusic took issue with the title (claiming the genre "never went away") but named it a "pretty accurate sonic snapshot of the contemporary blues scene". He called the Malian choice for Disc Two "an interesting left-field touch".

Track listing

Disc One

Disc Two
All tracks on Disc Two are performed by Samba Touré, a guitarist from the Tombouctou Region of Mali who, though not related by blood, was raised as a protégé of Ali Farka Touré.

References

External links
 

2009 compilation albums
Blues Revival